This is a list of Lie group topics, by Wikipedia page.

Examples
See Table of Lie groups for a list

General linear group, special linear group
SL2(R)
SL2(C)
Unitary group, special unitary group
SU(2)
SU(3)
Orthogonal group, special orthogonal group
Rotation group SO(3)
SO(8)
Generalized orthogonal group, generalized special orthogonal group
The special unitary group SU(1,1) is the unit sphere in the ring of coquaternions. It is the group of hyperbolic motions of the Poincaré disk model of the Hyperbolic plane.
Lorentz group
Spinor group
Symplectic group
Exceptional groups
G2
F4
E6
E7
E8
Affine group
Euclidean group
Poincaré group
Heisenberg group

Lie algebras

Commutator
Jacobi identity
Universal enveloping algebra
Baker-Campbell-Hausdorff formula
Casimir invariant
Killing form
Kac–Moody algebra
Affine Lie algebra
Loop algebra
Graded Lie algebra

Foundational results

One-parameter group, One-parameter subgroup
Matrix exponential
Infinitesimal transformation
Lie's third theorem
Maurer–Cartan form
Cartan's theorem
Cartan's criterion
Local Lie group
Formal group law
Hilbert's fifth problem
Hilbert-Smith conjecture
Lie group decompositions
Real form (Lie theory)
Complex Lie group
Complexification (Lie group)

Semisimple theory

Simple Lie group
Compact Lie group, Compact real form
Semisimple Lie algebra
Root system
Simply laced group
ADE classification
Maximal torus
Weyl group
Dynkin diagram
Weyl character formula

Representation theory

Representation of a Lie group
Representation of a Lie algebra
Adjoint representation of a Lie group
Adjoint representation of a Lie algebra
Unitary representation
Weight (representation theory)
Peter–Weyl theorem
Borel–Weil theorem
Kirillov character formula
Representation theory of SU(2)
Representation theory of SL2(R)

Applications

Physical theories
Pauli matrices
Gell-Mann matrices
Poisson bracket
Noether's theorem
Wigner's classification
Gauge theory
Grand unification theory
Supergroup
Lie superalgebra
Twistor theory
Anyon
Witt algebra
Virasoro algebra

Geometry
Erlangen programme
Homogeneous space
Principal homogeneous space
Invariant theory
Lie derivative
Darboux derivative
Lie groupoid
Lie algebroid

Discrete groups
Lattice (group)
Lattice (discrete subgroup)
Frieze group
Wallpaper group
Space group
Crystallographic group
Fuchsian group
Modular group
Congruence subgroup
Kleinian group
Discrete Heisenberg group
Clifford–Klein form

Algebraic groups
Borel subgroup
Parabolic subgroup
Arithmetic group

Special functions

Dunkl operator

Automorphic forms
Modular form
Langlands program

People

Sophus Lie (1842 – 1899)
Wilhelm Killing (1847 – 1923)
Élie Cartan (1869 – 1951)
Hermann Weyl (1885 – 1955)
Harish-Chandra (1923 – 1983)
Lajos Pukánszky (1928 – 1996)
Bertram Kostant (1928 – 2017)

Lie groups
 
Lie algebras
Lie groups
Lie groups